Abdalla Mamduh Abdelaziz (born 29 March 1999) is an Egyptian karateka. He won the silver medal in the men's 75 kg event at the 2021 World Karate Championships held in Dubai, United Arab Emirates. He won silver medal in the Men’s Individual -75 Kg Kumite Karate at the 2019 African Games was held from 24 to 26 August 2019 in Rabat, Morocco and Gold Medal in the Men’s Individual -75 Kg Kumite  (UFAK) JUNIOR & SENIOR CHAMPIONSHIPS ( Continental Championship)  2020 at Tangier, Morocco.

Career
Previously he won two time bronze Medals in Junior, Cadet and U21 World Championship in the year of 2015 and 2019. He also won several medals, including gold, Silver and bronze medals in the African Continental Championship  & Mediterranean Championships as well as World Karate Federation Karate 1 Premier League  and Series A Championships.

Achievements 
He qualified for the 2020 Summer Olympics in Tokyo, Japan Continental Representation qualifying spots, where karate will be featured for the first time and Now he will represent Egypt Team at the 2020 Summer Olympics at the Karate competition of the 2020 Summer Olympics in Tokyo, Japan

References

External links 
 
 

1999 births
Living people
Place of birth missing (living people)
Egyptian male karateka
Competitors at the 2019 African Games
African Games silver medalists for Egypt
African Games medalists in karate
Karateka at the 2020 Summer Olympics
Olympic karateka of Egypt
Competitors at the 2022 Mediterranean Games
Mediterranean Games medalists in karate
Mediterranean Games silver medalists for Egypt
Competitors at the 2022 World Games
World Games medalists in karate
World Games gold medalists
21st-century Egyptian people